Bring On the Night is an Indian television mini-series that premiered on MTV India on 22 September 2012, starring Arjun Mathur, Patrick Graham, Hussain Dalal and Sarang Sathaye. The show follows Kabir "KD" Dalal, an entrepreneur in his late 20s, as he and his friends turn a 200-year-old heritage building in Mumbai into an all-night club. The series was written, conceptualized and directed by Vishwesh Krishnamoorthy.

Plot 
The show revolves around Kabir "KD" Dalal (Arjun Mathur) and his motley group of friends: Patrick Graham Fairbottom (Patrick Graham), Devang Oza (Hussain Dalal) and Maakad (Sarang Sathaye). Together with Patrick's ex-girlfriend Sheila Sethi (Dilkhush Reporter) and her friend Piyali Chaudhry (Geetika Tyagi), the Mistry brothers - the uptight Xerxes Mistry (Afshad Kelawala) and the dim-witted Hoshang Mistry (Kashyap Kapoor) - and their best friend Darius Dorabjee (Danesh Irani), the group converts a dilapidated 200-year-old building into a club.

Kabir is the manager at one of Mumbai's top nightclubs. However, one night a freak mishap leaves one of the regulars dead and hundreds of people sick. As a result, the club is shut down. Later, it turns out that Maakad had unwittingly supplied impure water, which led to the incident. This turns the relationship between  Kabir and Maakad sour and Kabir shuts himself in his room for weeks.

His self-confinement ends when he accompanies friends to a party at an abandoned place owned by the father of the Mistry brothers. KD is struck by the place and decides to turn it into an all-night party hangout. With his friends chipping in, he sets about the task. One thing leads to another and the club, christened "The Den", becomes Mumbai's top hangout.

Its growing popularity catches the eye of gangster/politician Ravi Jhawle (Ravindra Ramkant). A heated exchange between Jhawle and KD leads to the club being shut down and KD landing in jail. However, with the help of the father of the Mistry brothers, the aristocratic and influential Sir Malcolm Mistry (Nikhil Kapoor), KD manages to escape. The show ends with the group bringing down Ravi Jhawle's political career, and the party continues once again.

Cast and characters

Cast
 Arjun Mathur as Kabir "KD" Dalal
 Patrick Graham as Patrick Graham Fairbottom
 Hussain Dalal as Devang Oza
 Sarang Sathaye as Maakad
 Danesh Irani as Darius Dorabjee
 Afshad Kelawala as Xerxes Mistry
 Kashyap Kapoor as Hoshang Mistry
 Dilkhush Reporter as Sheila Sethi
 Geetika Tyagi as Piyali Chaudhry

Recurring Characters

 Jay Bemte as Billa
 Jagdish Chauhan as Dudu
 Ravindra Ramkant as Ravi Jhawle
 Prashant Bhosle as Inspector Dev Chakke
 Narendra Jadhav as Sub Inspector Santosh Dharane
 Preetika Chawla as Jigna Sanghvi
 Virendra Pandey as Bhikurao Mhatre
 Ravi Popat as Popat
 Jaywant Wadkar as Bhau Thakur Naik
 Alwin as Chotu Chaiwala
 Sohrab Ardeshir as Dinkoo Dorabjee
 Amar Banerjee as Azad Bhai
 Nikhil Kapoor as Malcolm Mistry
 Jai Row Kavi as Lele
 Prashant Prakash as Behzad Gazder

Broadcast

References

External links 
 "Official Page" MTV India
 

MTV (Indian TV channel) original programming
2010s Indian television miniseries
2012 Indian television series debuts
2012 Indian television series endings